On 6 February 2023 a referendum was held in the Wolayita, Gamo, Gofa, South Omo, Gedeo, and Konso Zones, as well as the Dirashe, Amaro, Burji, Ale, and Basketo special woredas of the Southern Nations, Nationalities, and Peoples' Region (SNNP) of Ethiopia, on whether the included areas should leave SNNP and form their own Region.

This referendum follows two previous referendums from 2019 and 2021 in other areas of the then-SNNP, both of which resulted in votes to split off into new regions.

The referendum was tentatively approved, although Wolayita Zone must rehold voting after it was found that irregularities were present. The other zones and woredas involved passed resolutions to split off in July 2023, and this was conveyed to the national House of Federation by the SNNP government. The new region's name was set as the Southern Ethiopia Region.

Background
The Constitution of Ethiopia grants every ethnic group the right to have their own region in Ethiopia. The Southern Nations, Nationalities, and Peoples' Region (SNNP) previously contained 56 ethnic groups. The ascension of prime minister Abiy Ahmed in 2018, along with his promises for reforms, reignited demands for autonomy by some ethnic groups in SNNP. The 2019 Sidama Region referendum saw the Sidama Region split off from the SNNP. A similar referendum in 2021 saw 5 zones and 1 special woreda leave the SNNP and form the new South West Region.

At the end of July 2022, 10 zones and 6 special woredas in SNNP passed resolutions aiming to split off two new states from what remained of the SNNP. These resolutions were greeted positively by the SNNP government. (There were reports that the Gurage Zone was also involved, however it wished to continue with a proposal it had submitted on 26 November 2018 to become its own region.)

On 5 August, the SNNP Council submitted the requests to the House of Federation. The Speaker of the House of Federation noted that the House would come to a quick decision, and tasked the National Election Board of Ethiopia with looking into carrying out the referendums. Official approval of the referendum by the House of Federation for the proposal given by from 6 zones and 5 special woredas occurred on 18 August. Specifically, this was for the Wolayita, Gamo, Gofa, South Omo, Gedeo, and Konso Zones, as well as the Dirashe, Amaro, Burji, Ale, and Basketo special woredas. (The simultaneous request, from the Hadiya, Halaba, Kembata Tembaro, and Silte Zones, and the Yem Special Woreda request has not yet been acted upon.) The House of Federation requested the referendum, for a new South Ethiopia Region, be held within three months.

In September the National Election Board submitted a budget request to the House of Peoples' Representatives.

On 10 October the National Election Board announced that a referendum would be held in parts of Southern Nations, Nationalities, and Peoples' Region on 6 February, targeting results to be released on 15 February. Campaigning began on 17 October, and voter registration ran for two weeks beginning on 20 December. By 9 January, 2,934,143 voters had registered, and registration for 24 polling stations was extended.

Logistics
The National Election Board expected to hire 18,885 people, and requested 541,270,104.82 birr to carry out the referendum. 410.1 million birr was given. 5,200 election observers from Ethiopia and elsewhere were expected.

3,771 polling stations were set up, divided into 31 groups. These are expected to see around 3 million voters. Each polling station is expected to release its results over the five days following the referendum. To assist those with reading difficulties, each option on the referendum was also represented by an easily identifiable symbol: a white dove for a vote in favor of a new region, and a hut for a vote against.

Results
Full results were initially expected on 15 February, and partial results were released on 18 February. A decision on the results of the election in Wolaita Zone is pending due to stated irregularities before and during the election process and complaints of voter fraud.

Result by subdivision

References

External links
National Election Board of Ethiopia Referendums page

South Ethiopia Region
South Ethiopia Region 
Administrative division referendums
Autonomy referendums
February 2023 events in Africa
Referendums in Ethiopia